Louise de Prie de La Mothe-Houdancourt (1624–1709), was a French noblewoman and court official. She served as royal governess to the children of king Louis XIV of France in 1661–72, and to the children of Louis, Grand Dauphin in 1682–91.

Life
Louise de Prie was born to Louis de Prie, Marquis de Toucy, and Françoise de Saint-Gelais-Lusignan, and married Marshal Philippe de La Mothe-Houdancourt, duke de Cardona, in 1650. She became the mother of :
Françoise Angélique (1650-1711), married Louis, duc d'Aumont
Charlotte Éléonore Madeleine (1651-1744), Duchess of Ventadour by her marriage with Louis-Charles de Lévis and governess of Louis XV and his children, 
Marie Isabelle Gabrielle Angélique (1654-1726), married Henri François de Saint Nectaire (1657-1703), son of Henri de La Ferté-Senneterre and Duke of La Ferté-Senneterre.

References 
 Docteur Cabanès, Mœurs intimes du Passé - Huitème série, Éducation de Princes, Albin Michel, Editeur, Paris, 3e mille.

1624 births
1709 deaths
French duchesses
Court of Louis XIV
Governesses to the Children of France
17th-century French women
18th-century French women